Clifford Antone (October 27, 1949 – May 22, 2006) was the founder of the eponymous Austin blues club Antone's and independent record label Antone's Records and Tapes, as well as a mentor to Stevie Ray Vaughan, Jimmie Vaughan, Kim Wilson, Gary Clark, Jr. and numerous other musicians. He is the nephew of Jalal Antone, the founder of the Houston-based Antone's Import Co - known for its po-boy sandwiches.

Biography
Born in Port Arthur, Texas, to Greek Orthodox Lebanese American parents who had settled in Eastern Texas, Antone moved to Austin in 1968 and attended The University of Texas at Austin. An arrest for marijuana led to his dropping out of school. Nurturing a passion for Chicago blues, Antone started a blues club at age 25. The club, Antone's, became one of the first music venues on Austin's 6th Street and helped lead to Austin's reputation as a music city. Clifton Chenier, Fats Domino, John Lee Hooker, Delbert McClinton, Pinetop Perkins, Muddy Waters, Albert Collins, Jimmy Reed, Clarence "Gatemouth" Brown, B.B. King, Sue Foley, Gary Clark Jr. and many other notable blues musicians have performed at Antone's since 1975. 
 
In 1987, Antone founded a recording label, Antone's Records and Tapes (later renamed as Antone's Records). He also opened Antone's Record Shop, a record store specializing in blues and roots music. Antone served time in federal prisons for drug charges in the early 1980s and in 2000. He lectured on social change and the history of the blues at The University of Texas, Austin Community College, and Texas State University in San Marcos, Texas. On hearing of Antone's death, Austin Mayor Will Wynn was quoted as saying, "One of the primary reasons Austin is known as the Live Music Capital of the World is because of Clifford Antone."

In June 1997 the United States court system charged Antone with 11 counts of drug trafficking. The accusation stated that he helped traffic drugs from Mexico. He pleaded guilty to a money laundering count and a distribution count, relating to marijuana, on January 6, 1999. He was sentenced to four years in federal prison.

He died in Austin, Texas at age 56.

References

Sources

External links

 Clifford Antone's official site www.CliffordAntone.com
 
 Antone's Night Club official site www.AntonesNightClub.com
 Antone's Record Shop official site www.AntonesRecordShop.com
 Clifford Antone at Discogs
 Antone’s Nightclub at Discogs
 Antone's Records & Tapes at Discogs
 Antone's Records at Discogs
'Antone's: Home of the Blues' DVD
Antone's lectures at the University of Texas at Austin

1949 births
2006 deaths
People from Austin, Texas
People from Port Arthur, Texas
American people of Lebanese descent
University of Texas at Austin alumni
University of Texas at Austin faculty
Blues historians